The Echo Klassik, often stylized as ECHO Klassik, was Germany's major classical music award in 22 categories.

Ceremonies

References

External links
  (archived)

Classical music awards
German music awards
1994 establishments in Germany
Awards established in 1994
2018 disestablishments in Germany
Awards disestablished in 2018